Wayne Denne (born 5 March 1976 in Cape Town, Western Cape) is a field hockey player from South Africa, who was a member of the national squad that finished tenth at the 2004 Summer Olympics in Athens. He made his international debut for his native country in 1995, against Australia at the Indra Gandhi Gold Cup in India. The midfielder played for Western Province.

International Senior Tournaments
 1997 – World Cup Qualifier, Kuala Lumpur (9th)
 1999 – All-Africa Games, Johannesburg (1st)
 2002 – World Cup, Kuala Lumpur (13th)
 2002 – Commonwealth Games, Manchester (4th)
 2003 – Champions Challenge, Johannesburg (3rd)
 2004 – Olympic Qualifier, Madrid (7th)
 2004 – Summer Olympics, Athens (10th)

References
 sports-reference

External links
 

1976 births
Living people
South African male field hockey players
Male field hockey midfielders
Olympic field hockey players of South Africa
Field hockey players at the 2002 Commonwealth Games
2002 Men's Hockey World Cup players
Field hockey players at the 2004 Summer Olympics
Sportspeople from Cape Town
Commonwealth Games competitors for South Africa
Team Bath Buccaneers Hockey Club players
African Games gold medalists for South Africa
Competitors at the 1999 All-Africa Games
African Games medalists in field hockey
20th-century South African people
21st-century South African people